Staraya Kalitva is a rural locality (a selo) and the administrative center of Starokalitvenskoye Rural Settlement, Rossoshansky District, Voronezh Oblast, Russia. The population was 1,439 as of 2010. There are 28 streets.

Geography 
Staraya Kalitva is located on the right bank of the Don River, 35 km east of Rossosh (the district's administrative centre) by road. Novaya Kalitva is the nearest rural locality.

References 

Rural localities in Rossoshansky District
Ostrogozhsky Uyezd